The New Frontier Theater, known as the Kia Theatre between 2015 and 2018, is a multi-purpose events hall in the Araneta City in Cubao, Quezon City, Metro Manila, Philippines. The theater has a 2,385 seating capacity and is used for a variety of events, ranging from performing and visual arts, local and international concerts, and fan meet-up gatherings.

History

First opening
The theater first opened on May 27, 1967 as the New Frontier Cinema-Theater and  considered to be the biggest theater in the Philippines, with a 3,500 seating capacity. The theater is influenced by the Radio City Music Hall, and also had an ice skating rink and a roller skating rink, which opened in 1968 and has a capacity of 900 skaters. The skating rink catered numerous customers, ranging from the masses to elite members of influential families. It was used until the mid-1990s, after which the theater fell into disuse due to the emergence of home video, as well as competition of new malls with cinemas, causing standalone theaters to deteriorate and close operations.

Renovation plans and second opening
Plans for the renovation of the theater were laid out as early as 2003, however, further redevelopment plans were opened, which also includes utilizing the space to demolish the theater and to rebuild it alongside a proposed 30+ storey mixed-use tower. The plans for the mixed-use tower development were unveiled in 2005, as part of the later stages of the Araneta City master plan, in the aftermath of the early plans for the development of Manhattan Garden City. 11 years later after the announcement of the planned renovation of the theater, the plans were finalized for the gentrification of the theater and the renovation works would have been completed in an earlier date. The renovation project began in 2014 and was reopened on August 15, 2015, tapping Megawide Construction Corporation as the general contractor of the project. The renovation project costed ₱500 million, including the preservation of the original facade of the building, and the installation of new modern seats. The theater currently has a 2,385 seating capacity.

The theater was renamed "Kia Theatre" after the Araneta Group signed a five-year licensing deal with Columbian Autocar Corporation, the Philippine distributor for Kia Motors until 2018, on July 15, 2015. The theater façade would feature a  Kia showroom as part of the agreement.

The theater began accommodating performances and guests with the staging of the musical, MLQ: Ang Buhay ni Manuel Luis Quezon. The first commercial show of the theater upon its reopening was The Disney Live! Mickey’s Music Festival which ran from September 1 to 6, 2015.

The theater reverted to its original name, the "New Frontier Theater" on October 1, 2018, and was temporarily closed for more than a year due to COVID-19 pandemic. On June 21, 2021, the theater began serving as a secondary vaccination center, sharing its purpose with the Smart Araneta Coliseum for the rollout of the Quezon City vaccination drive against the COVID-19 pandemic, capable of vaccinating 1,000 to 1,500 people daily. On February 21, 2022, the theater now serves as a vaccination center for children aged 5–11 years old, in partnership with the QC Local Government.

Location
The theater is located within the northern area Araneta City, a mixed-use commercial development, owned by the Araneta Group, as the theater is located close to the Aurora Tower, and is connected to the Gateway Mall and the Manhattan Parkview via elevated bridges, both completed on the 3rd quarter of 2018 and on the 3rd quarter of 2019, respectively. The theater is accessible to nearby transport points and railway stations such as the MRT 3 Cubao Station, the LRT 2 Cubao Station and other transport stations. The theater is accessible to nearby malls and buildings within the Araneta City complex, such as the Farmers Plaza, the Araneta City Cyberpark towers, the SM Cubao, the Ali Mall, and the Manhattan Gardens condominiums, while also located close to hotels such as the Novotel Manila Araneta City and the Ibis Styles Araneta City.

Design 
The theater's current design was based on its original design, as the theater's original facade was gentrified while expanding the theater's floor area and modernizing its amenities. The renovated theater's entrance is located within General Aguinaldo Avenue, and also features side balconies with planters, escalators and elevators throughout the theater, and expanded walkways and floor spaces within the theater's architectural design. New Frontier Theater also features two LED billboards located within the facade, along multi-level dining spaces occupied by restaurants and studios. The theater's second level also serves as a retail area for various small businesses, which became known as the NFT Second Al Fresco.

Gallery

See also
List of entertainment events at the Araneta Center

References

Buildings and structures in Quezon City
Kia Motors
Tourist attractions in Quezon City
Theaters and concert halls in Metro Manila
Theatres completed in 1967
1967 establishments in the Philippines